Pool A of the 2021 Rugby World Cup began on 8 October 2022. The pool includes hosts and five-time and defending champions New Zealand, Australia and Wales. Australia and Wales finished sixth and seventh respectively in 2017. They are joined by Scotland, the winners of the Final Qualification Tournament.

Standings 

All times are local New Zealand Daylight Time (UTC+13)

Australia vs New Zealand

Wales vs Scotland

Scotland vs Australia

Notes:
Maya Stewart (Australia) made her international debut.

Wales vs New Zealand

{| border="0" style="width:100%"
|-
!Team details
|-
|

Assistant referees:
Julianne Zussman (Canada)
Tyler Miller (New Zealand)
Television match official:
Chris Assmus (Canada)

Australia vs Wales

Notes:
Siwan Lillicrap (Wales) earned her 50th test cap.

New Zealand vs Scotland

{| border="0" style="width:100%"
|-
!Team details
|-
|

Assistant referees:
Clara Munarini (Italy)
Kat Roche (United States)
Television match official:
Chris Assmus (Canada)

Notes

References

Pool A
2022 in New Zealand rugby union
2022 in Australian rugby union
2022–23 in Welsh rugby union
2022–23 in Scottish rugby union